Grimeborn is an annual East London musical theatre and opera festival which coincides with the world famous East Sussex Glyndebourne Opera Festival.  Founded by Arcola Theatre’s artistic director Mehmet Ergen in 2007, the festival is held at Arcola Theatre in Dalston, East London. It takes place in and around August, and tends to showcase new and experimental works alongside radical productions of classic opera, using both the Arcola's performing stages.

History
The festival's name is a punning reference to Glyndebourne. The "grime" element refers to the "dirtier" backdrop of the Arcola Theatre, a converted textile factory in the congested bustle of Hackney as opposed to the scenic gardens of East Sussex. 

Originally, Grimeborn was devised as a contemporary contribution to the Battersea Arts Centre's (BAC) Opera Festival. The BAC Opera Festival's Artistic Director at the time, Tom Morris, asked Ergen, who was working at the BAC as an Associate Producer, to create something different from normal operatic preconceptions in a manner similar to Tête à Tête, who were also taking the stage at the BAC Opera Festival that year. Grimeborn became an opera and musical theatre festival in its own right, with the Arcola Theatre its exclusive host.

Past performances

2019

2018
List not complete: awaiting further additions

2017
List not complete: awaiting further additions

2015
List not complete: awaiting further additions

2014
List not complete: awaiting further additions

2012
Curated by Mehmet Ergen and produced by Leyla Nazli (21 August - 8 September)

2011

2010
Curated by Andrew Steggall and produced by Leyla Nazli (9 August – 21 September)

2009
Curated by Alex Sutton and produced by Leyla Nazli (24 August – 5 September)
 The Descent of Inanna: Bare Bones Version, Produced by: Opera Exchange
 An Unorthodox 1-2 Produced by: Aurelie
 Ride, Produced by: Filament, Composer: Osnat Schmool, Director: Sabina Netherclift
 Phedre, Produced by: ElectrOpera, Composers: Sally Rodgers, Steve Jones, Director: Philippe Cherbonnier
 Something Strange by Rebecca Applin and Michael Caines
 To Die A Second Time, Produced by: Double Agent, Director: Teunkie Van Der Sluijs
 The Tender Land by Aaron Copland, Produced by: Mad Cow Theatre Company, Director: Katherine Hare, Musical Director: Leigh Thompson, Choreographer: Racky Plews
The Savage (original story David Almond) & The Island (original story Armin Greeder), Composed, written and performed by the Arcola Youth Project under the guidance of Jenifer Toksvig (libretto) and Nick Sutton (music).
 Disappeared, Produced by: The Theory of Everything, Devised and directed by: Pia Furtado and members of the cast, featuring traditional gypsy music Inspired by and featuring Janáček's song cycle.
 The Work Of Art by Conor Mitchell and Jenifer Toksvig
 Goodbye Barcelona, Produced by: Arcola Theatre, Composer: KS Lewkowicz, Playwright: Judith Johnson, Director: Karen Rabinowitz
 Why Are Clowns?, Produced by: L'Oiseau Chante, Composer: Ewen Moore, Director: Aaron Paterson
 Presenting... The News, Produced by: Size Zero Music Theatre, Composer & Director: Laura Jayne Bowler
 Dante by Peter Longworth, Director: Holly McBride
 The Wonderful Thing About Lizards by Lucy Smith, Director: Toria Banks
 Abraham and Isaac, Produced by: Metta Theatre, Composer: Benjamin Britten, Director: Poppy Burton-Morgan
 Pig, Greed (Jonathan Dove);  Cinderella(Stephen Oliver Produced by: Bitesize Opera, Director: Toria Banks
 Jephtha by Handel, Director: Ralph Bridle, Conductor: Wolfgang Kostner
 Stolen Voices by Neyire Ashworth, Director & Co-devisor: Kath Burlinson
 La Voix Humaine, Produced by: Renée Salewski & Flat Earth Theatre, Composer: Francis Poulenc, Librettist: Jean Cocteau, Director: Robin Norton-Hale
 A Shropshire Lad, Produced by: Pst! Productions, Cast: Peter Shipman, Director: Jan-Willem van den Bosch
 The Telephone by Gian Carlo Menotti, Director: Nina Brazier, Designer: Polly Webb-Wilson, Costumes: Giulia Scrimieri
 The Singing Bone/Domestic, Produced by: The Stephen Crowe Ensemble, Composer: Stephen Crowe, Directors: Seonaid Goody and Stephen Crowe
 The Woodcutter's Daughter, Produced by: Eclectic Opera, Composer: Richard Cartmale, Librettist: Buffy Sharpe, Cast: Belinda Evans, Glenn Tweedie, Peter Shipman
 Songs Of Alchemy, Produced by: Eclectic Opera, Composer: Kirsten Morrison, Director: Jan-Willem van den Bosch
 Grimethorpe Race Presented by: Shared Property Theatre Company Directors: Lizzie Newman and Rachel Parish, Designer: Lucy Sierra, Scenic Artist: Zoe Parsons
 The Spoils, Produced by: Shady Dolls Theatre Company, Composer: Paul Englishby, Director: Steven Dykes
 Music Theatre Now - a cabaret evening dedicated to new musical theatre writing. Featured Composers: Conor Mitchell, Adam Guettel, Raymond Yiu, Ricky Ian Gordon, Tim Saward, Matt Print Director: Alex Sutton, Musical Direction: Leigh Thompson, Cast: Clare Burt and the London Show Choir
 Figaro - The Loyal Subject, Produced by: Grimeborn Opera, Composers: Mozart, Rossini, Milhaud, Adaptator & Director: Barnaby Rayfield
 Why Don't You Just Sing Jazz?, Produced by: Opera in Colour, Writer & Director: Roger Mortimer-Smith, Devised and produced by: Nadine Mortimer-Smith, Musical Direction: Peter Crockford
 Hothouse, Directed by: Sophie Austin, Musical Direction: Jamie Fagg, Produced by: Kas Darley and Sophie Austin

2008
Curated by Daniele Guerra and produced by Michael Harris and Leyla Nazli (4–23 August)

 The Old Maid and the Thief - composer/librettist: Gian Carlo Menotti; director: Nina Brazier; conductor: Timothy Burke
 A Man of Feeling - composer/librettist: Stephen Oliver; director: Anthony Baker; music director: Tim Henty; soprano: Lisa Wilson; baritone: John Savournin; pianist: James Young
 Dreamspiel - performed by the Ukulele Orchestra of Great Britain; composer: George Hincliffe; librettist: Michelle Carter
 Kindertotenlieder (Songs on the Deaths of Children) - composer: Gustav Mahler; producer/performer: Siobhan Mooney, Mezzo Soprano with Devon Harrison, Baritone and lip-synch-mime artists, Dickie Beau and Lisa Lee - semi-staged and re-imagined by Siobhan Mooney as an anguished duet of blame between Father and Mother. Loosely based on the disappearance of Madeleine McCann director: Janwillen van den Bosch; pianist: Linda Ang
 The Elephant's Child - performed by Metta Theatre; composer: Jessica Dannheisser; director: Poppy Burton-Morgan
 The Nightingale and the Rose - composer/librettist: Jenny Gould; director: Tom Mansfield
 Desire Caught by the Tail - composer: Joseph Finlay; director: Max Webster; associate director: Rachel Grunwald
 Goodbye Barcelona - book: Judith Johnson; music and lyrics: Karl Lewkowicz; director: Mehmet Ergen
 ASH - composer: Rachel Fuller; librettist/director: Jack Shepherd
 Opera of Surveillance - performed by Conversations with Sound and The Irrepressibles; composer/voice practitioner: Jamie McDermott; sound design: William Turner Duffin
 My Feet May Take a Little While (The Errollyn Wallen Songbook) - composer/music director: Errollyn Wallen; director: Daniele Guerra
 Man with a Movie Camera - based on the score composed by Michael Nyman for the British Film Institute's 2002 release of the silent movie Man with a Movie Camera; director: Nigel Lowery
 Kaspar Hauser - based on the story of Kaspar Hauser; composer: Alexis Pope; librettist/director: Anke Rauthmann; musical director: Philip Headlam; designer: Num Stibbe
 Pierrot Lunaire - performed by Cornucopia Theatre Company; composer: Arnold Schönberg to poems by Albert Giraud; director: Mark Duncan
 Choice - performed by Citric Acid Productions
Astyanax - by Waterfield & Burke
A Little Chamber Music - based on the work by Hindemith
The Boy Who Said Yes by Bertolt Brecht and Kurt Weill; musical director: Timothy Burke; director: Alex Sutton
 The Girl Who Liked to be Thrown Around - performed by Madestrange Opera; composer: Michael Oliva; text: Michael Oliva and Deepak Kalha
 The Bacchae - composer/librettist/musical & artistic director: Alexis Pope; soprano: Tatjana Kiliani; tenor: Emmanuel Fort; bass: Andrew Young; First Bacchae: Sibylla Meienberg
Stabat Mater - adapted by Buffy Sharpe from Pergolesi's Stabat Mater; performed by Eclectic Opera; director: Poppy Burton-Morgan; soprano: Anna Gregory; countertenor: Peter Shipman; actress: Sarah Paul
Holoray Holiday - book and lyrics: Rebecca and Sharon Nassauer; composer: Sharon Nassauer; director: Michael Alvarez; musical director: Candida Caldicot

2007
Curated by Andrew Steggall and produced by Michael Harris and Leyla Nazli (19 August- 2 September)
 The Crocodile  - composed by Llywelyn ap Myrddin.
 Hey Jack  - composed by Sharon Nassauer, Lyrics by Jackson Lee and directed by Loveday Ingram.
Nosferatu
Opera Cabaret
The Tales of Hoffmann - based on Offenbach's Les contes d'Hoffmann
Dichterliebe - composed by Robert Schumann to poetry by Heinrich Heine
Devils Drum
Arianna a Naxos - based on Haydn's cantata of the same name
Visions of 7 – conceived and composed by Joanna Foster, performed by 'Anima' with Javier Carmona on percussion.
Vice - jazz opera based on The Revenger's Tragedy by Cyril Tourneur.  Written by Jools Scott and Sue Curtis. Directed by Sue Curtis.
The Universal Will to Self-Destruct
Flood - composed & written by Kirsten Morrison and Buffy Sharpe. Performed by Kirsten Morrison Soprano, Siobhan Mooney Mezzo Soprano and Oliver Gibbs Baritone Visuals by Franny Armstrong.
Pierre - adapted by composer Richard Beaudoin, conducted by Christopher Ward, directed by Andrew Steggall, and played by Constantine Finehouse. The cast included Joseph Kaiser (Tamino in Kenneth Branagh's film The Magic Flute),
Persephone - a masque in the making. Words by Simon Rae, music by Sue Casson. Amongst the performers Felix Kemp and Sue Casson.
 Fountain Sealed - by Nathan Williamson, Thomas Walton and James Methven.

See also
List of opera festivals
List of music festivals in the United Kingdom

References

Sources
Arcola Theatre Past productions. Accessed 17 February 2009.
Christiansen, Rupert, Grimeborn review: Thrilling romanticism at a very hip party, Daily Telegraph, 31 August 2007. Accessed 17 February 2009.
Kimberley, Nick, Glorious grime in Grimeborn, Evening Standard 5 August 2008. Accessed 17 February 2009.
 Blunt, Thomas, Conductor , “Music at Plush” Accessed 16 August 2010
Tanner, Mark, “The Spectator, 5 September 2009, Accessed 16 August 2010.
Taylor, Sebastian, “Islington Tribune”, 12 August 2010, Accessed 16 August 2010
, “Hackney Gazette”, 9 July 2010, Accessed 16 August 2010
 Hall, George,, “The Stage”, 11 August 2010, Accessed 16 August 2010
 , “East London Lines”, 11 August 2010, Accessed 15 August 2010
Baracaia, Alexa, “The London Paper”, 20 August 2009, Accessed 15 August 2010

External links
Official page on Arcola Theatre website

Opera festivals
Music festivals in London
2007 establishments in England
Music festivals established in 2007
Opera in London